Zanclognatha pedipilalis, the grayish zanclognatha, is a litter moth of the family Erebidae. The species was first described by Achille Guenée in 1854. It is found in eastern North America, from Nova Scotia south to Florida and Mississippi, west to Alberta and Kansas.

Adults are on wing from May to August. There is one generation in the north, with a partial second brood in Connecticut. There are two broods in Missouri and multiple generations in Florida.

The larvae feed on dead leaves in deciduous woods.

External links

pedipilalis
Moths of North America
Taxa named by Achille Guenée